Northern Kuki-Chin (or Northeastern Kuki-Chin) is a branch of Kuki-Chin languages. It is called Northeastern Kuki-Chin by Peterson (2017) to distinguish it from the Northwestern Kuki-Chin languages. VanBik (2009:31) also calls the branch Northern Chin or Zo.

Except for Thado speakers, most Northern Kuki-Chin speakers self-identify as part of a wider Zomi ethnic group.

Lingua francas
Tedim is the local lingua franca of northern Chin State, Myanmar, while Thado (also known as Kuki) is the local lingua franca of much of southern Manipur State, India.

Languages
VanBik (2009) includes the following languages as Northern Kuki-Chin languages. The positions of Ngawn and Ralte are not addressed by VanBik (2009), but they are classified as Northern Kuki-Chin in Glottolog.

Thado (Kuki)
Tedim
Paite
Gangte
Simte
Chiru
Sizang
Ralte
Vaiphei
Zo
Ngawn

Zomi languages

The Zomi languages refer to most of the Northern Kuki-Chin languages, excluding Thado (Kuki) and a few other peripheral languages. Zomi is a cultural cover term that refers to speakers of languages such as Tedim, Paite, Simte, Zou, Vaiphei, and Ralte. Organizations such as the Zomi Language & Literature Society (ZOLLS) in Churachandpur, Manipur, India are currently working on developing a unified standard "Zomi" language.

Classification
VanBik (2009:31) divides the Northern Kuki-Chin branch into two major language clusters, namely the Thado cluster and Sizang cluster.
Thado cluster: Thado/Kuki, Tedim, Khuangsai, Paite, Vuite, Chiru, Zou, Ralte 
Sizang cluster: Sizang/Siyin, Guite/Nguite, Vaiphei, Zo

Sound changes
VanBik (2009) lists the following sound changes from Proto-Kuki-Chin to Proto-Northern Chin.
Proto-Kuki-Chin *-r > Proto-Northern Chin *-k
Proto-Kuki-Chin * θ- > Proto-Northern Chin *ts-
Proto-Kuki-Chin *kl- > Proto-Northern Chin *tl-

Further reading
S. Dal Sian Pau. 2014. The comparative study of Proto-Zomi (Kuki-Chin) languages. Lamka, Manipur, India: Zomi Language & Literature Society (ZOLLS). [Comparative word list of Paite, Simte, Thangkhal, Zou, Kom, Tedim, and Vaiphei]

References

Button, Christopher. 2011. Proto Northern Chin. STEDT Monograph 10. .
Peterson, David. 2017. "On Kuki-Chin subgrouping." In Picus Sizhi Ding and Jamin Pelkey, eds. Sociohistorical linguistics in Southeast Asia: New horizons for Tibeto-Burman studies in honor of David Bradley, 189-209. Leiden: Brill.
VanBik, Kenneth. 2009. Proto-Kuki-Chin: A Reconstructed Ancestor of the Kuki-Chin Languages. STEDT Monograph 8. .